Walewale Senior High Technical School (WALSECTECH) is a second-cycle institution located in Walewale, West Mamprusi District, North east Region of Ghana. Walewale Senior High School belongs to category C. The current headmaster of the school is Sebeyam Ben Ibrahim.

History 
The school was established in 1982. In 2014, the headmaster of the school was Chief Kuipo Harrison. In 2019, the student population of school was about 2276 students. In April 2022, the school was provided with ICT equipment and facilities by the Israeli Embassy in Ghana.

Courses offered 
Courses offered in the school includes:  

 Business
 Technical
 Home economics 
 Visual art
 General arts 
 General science

References 

High schools in Ghana
Education in Ghana
1982 establishments in Ghana